Vadathirthesvarar Temple, Andanallur, is a Siva temple in Andanallur in Trichy District in Tamil Nadu (India).

Vaippu Sthalam
It is one of the shrines of the Vaippu Sthalams. This temple is found at Andanallur near Tiruchendurai in Trichy-Karur road.

Presiding deity
The presiding deity Vadathirthesvarar and Alandurai Mahadevar. His consort is known as Balasundari and Balasoundaranayaki. The niches of the karnakutas of the first tala contains images of a kneeling man on the left and a kneeling lady in the right. Such a feature is otherwise found in Neyyadiappar Temple, Tillaistanam and Dandeeswarar Temple in Velachery.

Prakara
This temple belongs to the period of Parantaka Chola. In the Prakaram shrines of Vinayaka, Subramania Gajalakshmi, Navagraha, Chandra, Surya and Bairava are found.

References

External links
 மூவர் தேவார வைப்புத்தலங்கள், AlandhuRai, Sl.No.18 of 139 temples

Hindu temples in Tiruchirappalli district
Shiva temples in Tiruchirappalli district